Crâmpoia is a commune in Olt County, Muntenia, Romania. It is composed of two villages, Buta and Crâmpoia.

Natives
 Nicușor Bancu

References

Communes in Olt County
Localities in Muntenia